José Severo Quiñones Caro (November 6, 1838 – November 6, 1909) was the first Chief Justice of the Supreme Court of Puerto Rico.

Born in San Juan, Puerto Rico, he began his formal studies in Puerto Rico before continuing the study of law at University of Seville and Madrid Central University in Spain.  After obtaining his law degree in 1860, he was admitted to the bar in Puerto Rico two years later.  Between 1871 and 1898 he held several important positions in Puerto Rico's colonial administration, including acting Treasury Minister.  During Puerto Rico's first and only autonomic government under Spain in 1898, Quiñones served as Secretary of Agriculture, Commerce and Industry.  While that post was short-lived due to the arrival of United States troops on July 25, 1898, General John R. Brooke appointed him president of the Territorial Audience, Puerto Rico's highest court.

Once civil rule was established in Puerto Rico, President William McKinley appointed Quiñones as the new Supreme Court's Chief Justice, a post held until his death, on his birthday, in 1909. He was buried at Church of Saint Francis of Assisi, San Juan.

Sources 

La Justicia en sus Manos, by Luis Rafael Rivera, 2007, 

1838 births
1909 deaths
Chief Justices of the Supreme Court of Puerto Rico
People from San Juan, Puerto Rico
Puerto Rican lawyers
University of Seville alumni
19th-century American judges